The Senate of the Philippines is the upper house of Congress. The Senate is composed of 24 senators, each elected to a six-year term, renewable once, under plurality-at-large voting: on each election, the voters vote for up to twelve candidates, with the twelve candidates the highest number of votes being elected in.

Prior to 1916, the Philippine Assembly, from 1935 to 1941 the National Assembly and from 1978 to 1986 the Batasang Pambansa (National Legislature) was the sole house of the legislature. In periods where the legislature was bicameral, the upper house has always been called as the "Senate". From 1972 to 1978 and from 1986 to 1987, the president possessed legislative powers.

List
Senators' terms are always for six years. Exceptions and details are:

 For those elected in under the Jones Law, terms start on election day, and end six years later.
 On the first legislature, the candidate that place 1st shall serve for six years, and those who placed 2nd shall serve three years.
 A new constitution was ratified after the 10th Legislature, abolishing the Senate. Senators' terms ended once the 1935 constitution was put into effect on September 16, 1935
 For those elected in under the 1935 constitution as amended, terms start on December 30 after their election and end December 30 six years later.
 For those elected in 1941, the first Congress convened on July 4, 1945, or almost four years from when the winning candidates' terms started on December 30, 1941. As no senatorial elections were held from 1941 up to that time, it was decided by lot who shall serve until 1946, and who shall serve until 1947.
 President Ferdinand Marcos declared martial law on September 23, 1971, while Senate was in recess. He prevented Congress from convening again, and a new constitution approved in 1973 abolished the Senate.
 For those elected in under the 1987 constitution, terms start on June 30 after their election and end June 30 six years later:
 For those elected in on the first Congress after the ratification of the constitution, the senators served from June 30, 1987, to June 30, 1992.
 For those elected in on the second Congress after the ratification of the constitution, the senators that finished 1st to 12th in the 1992 election served from June 30, 1992, to June 30, 1998. Those who finished 13th to 24th served from June 30, 1992, to June 30, 1995.

A

B

C

D

E

F

G

H

I

J

K

L

M

N

O

P

Q

R

S

T

V

W

Y

Z

See also

Died before taking office 
These won senatorial elections, but died prior to taking office:

List of members of the House of Representatives of the Philippines
List of women Senators of the Philippines

References 

 List of Previous Senators
 Roster of Philippine Senators

External links
Senate of the Philippines

 
Philippines
Senators